The North American Nanohertz Observatory for Gravitational Waves (NANOGrav) is a consortium of astronomers who share a common goal of detecting gravitational waves via regular observations of an ensemble of millisecond pulsars using the Green Bank and Arecibo radio telescopes. This project is being carried out in collaboration with international partners in the Parkes Pulsar Timing Array in Australia and the European Pulsar Timing Array as part of the International Pulsar Timing Array.

Gravitational wave detection using pulsar timing

Gravitational waves are an important prediction from Einstein's general theory of relativity and result from the bulk motion of matter, fluctuations during the early universe and the dynamics of space-time itself. Pulsars are rapidly rotating, highly magnetized neutron stars formed during the supernova explosions of massive stars. They act as highly accurate clocks with a wealth of physical applications ranging from celestial mechanics, neutron star seismology, tests of strong-field gravity and Galactic astronomy.

The idea to use pulsars as gravitational wave detectors was originally proposed by Sazhin and Detweiler in the late 1970s. The idea is to treat the solar system barycenter and a distant pulsar as opposite ends of an imaginary arm in space. The pulsar acts as the reference clock at one end of the arm sending out regular signals which are monitored by an observer on the Earth. The effect of a passing gravitational wave would be to perturb the local space-time metric and cause a change in the observed rotational frequency of the pulsar.

Hellings and Downs extended this idea in 1983 to an array of pulsars and found that a stochastic background of gravitational waves would produce a correlated signal for different angular separations on the sky. This work was limited in sensitivity by the precision and stability of the pulsar clocks in the array. Following the discovery of the first millisecond pulsar in 1982, Foster and Donald C. Backer were among the first astronomers to seriously improve the sensitivity to gravitational waves by applying the Hellings-Downs analysis to an array of highly stable millisecond pulsars.

In the past decade, the advent of state-of-the-art digital data acquisition systems, new radio
telescopes and receiver systems and the discoveries of many new pulsars has seen a significant advance in the sensitivity of the pulsar timing array to gravitational waves. The 2010 paper by Hobbs et al. summarizes the current state of the international effort. The 2013 Demorest et al. paper describes the five-year data release, analysis, and current upper limit of the stochastic gravitational wave background.

Funding sources

The research activities of NANOGrav are supported by a combination of single-investigator grants awarded through the Natural Sciences and Engineering Research Council (NSERC) in Canada, the National Science Foundation (NSF) and the  Research Corporation for Scientific Advancement in the USA. The NSF recently awarded a $6.8M dollar grant to researchers within NANOGrav as part of their Partnerships for International Research and Education (PIRE) program. In their recent Decadal Survey of Astronomy and Astrophysics, the National Academies of Science named NANOGrav as one of eight mid-scale astrophysics projects recommended as high priorities for funding in the next decade.

See also
 List of observatories

References

External links
 NANOGrav
 NANOGrav-PIRE project
 Parkes Pulsar Timing Array
 European Pulsar Timing Array

Gravitational wave observatories
Astronomical observatories in the United States
Radio astronomy
Astronomy organizations